First Lady of the Revolution is a 2016 feature-length documentary film about former first lady of Costa Rica Henrietta Boggs. The documentary is a Spark Media film and was directed and produced by Andrea Kalin.

Synopsis
While visiting an aunt and uncle in the exotic countryside of Costa Rica, a young southern belle from Alabama accepted a ride on the back of a motorcycle belonging to a local charismatic farmer — a ride that would propel her down narrow mountain roads and into history. First Lady of the Revolution is the story of Henrietta Boggs, who fell in love with a foreign land and the man destined to transform its identity. Her marriage to José Figueres Ferrer in 1941 led to a decade-long journey through activism, exile and political upheaval and, ultimately, lasting progressive reforms. First Lady of the Revolution is not only a depiction of the momentous struggle to shape Costa Rica's democratic identity; it's also a portrayal of how a courageous woman escaped the confines of a traditional, sheltered existence to expand her horizons into a new world, and live a life she never imagined.

Release
First Lady of the Revolution debuted in Birmingham, Alabama, at the Sidewalk Moving Picture Festival on August 27, 2016, where it won the Audience Award for Best Alabama Film and a Jury Award Honorable Mention. Henrietta Boggs also received the inaugural Spirit of Sidewalk Award. The film had its Costa Rican premiere on September 13, 2016,  at the Cine Magaly in San José, followed by a limited theatrical run in Costa Rica, New York City and Mexico.

The United States premiere was held at The Capri Theatre in Montgomery, Alabama, with Henrietta Boggs MacGuire and director Andrea Kalin in attendance and answering audience questions.

The film broadcast in 2018 as part of Reel South on PBS, a series that exhibits documentaries focusing on the Southern United States and the region's diverse voices and points of view.

Reception 
Following its premiere at Sidewalk Moving Picture Festival in 2016, Rick Harmon of Montgomery Advertiser wrote "It's a fascinating documentary...it leaves viewers hungering for more..." According to Eric Ginsburg of Triad City Beat First Lady of the Revolution "offers a unique perspective on a conflict that’s often overlooked." First Lady of the Revolution was the winner of the Audience Choice Award at Fairhope Film Festival and the Hoka Award for Best Documentary Feature at Oxford International Film Festival. The film also won three TIVA-DC awards, an IndieFEST Award of Excellence and a Spotlight Award.

Production team
 Director: Andrea Kalin
 Writer: Andrea Kalin
 Producer: Andrea Kalin
 Executive Producer: Martin Kalin
 Co-Producers: James Mirabello & Paulo Soto
 Associate Producer: Ethan Oser
 Directors of Photography: Dennis Boni & Paulo Soto
 Editor: David Grossbach
 Art Director: Luis G. Portillo

References

External links
 
 
 Henrietta Boggs, First Lady of the Revolution
 Discovering Henrietta: The Alabama woman who became Costa Rica’s first lady
 First Lady of the Revolution

American documentary films
English-language Costa Rican films
Costa Rican documentary films
2016 documentary films
Biographical documentary films
2010s American films